Myxococcus {{}} is a gram-negative, rod-shaped species of myxobacteria found in soil. It is a predator on other bacteria.

The ends of the rod-shaped vegetative cells taper slightly. The colonies are pale brown and show swarming motility. It produces orange, roughly spherical fruiting bodies. A draft sequence of its genome showed significant differences from all previously known species of the genus Myxococcus.

The scientific name of this bacterial species is considered the longest name in the binomial nomenclature system, bearing 73 characters in total.

See also
 List of long species names

References

Myxococcota
Bacteria described in 2020